The Novelist's Film is a 2022 South Korean black and white drama film written and directed by Hong Sang-soo. The Novelist's Film, starring Lee Hye-young and Kim Min-hee, was described as the film that "celebrates the beauty of chance encounters, while talking about the importance of authenticity in the dishonest world of cinema" by the executive director Carlo Chatrian of 72nd Berlin International Film Festival, where it premiered in the competition section on February 16, 2022. It is the third consecutive year that Hong Sang-soo has been invited to the festival. The film won the Silver Bear Grand Jury Prize at the festival, which is the 4th for the director Hong Sang-soo's films. It was released theatrically in South Korea on April 21, 2022.

Cast
 Lee Hye-young as novelist Jun-hee
 Kim Min-hee as Gil-soo, actress
 Jo Yoon-hee
 Seo Young-hwa 
 Kwon Hae-hyo   
 Gi Ju-bong 
 Park Mi-so 
 Ha Seong-guk

Production
The film was shot for two weeks outside Seoul in March 2021 with Lee Hye-young and Kim Min-hee as main leads. The still photos from production site were released on April 12, 2022.

Release
It was the third consecutive year for the film's director Hong Sang-soo to be competing for the main awards in the competition section of the Berlin International Film Festival. His previous two films The Woman Who Ran (2020) and Introduction (2021) were selected in the competition section at the 70th and 71st editions of the festival. The film screened on February 16, 2022 at Berlinale Palast for the first time. It was also screened in Career section at Buenos Aires International Independent Film Festival held from April 19 – May 1, 2022, and Istanbul Film Festival  on April 12, 2022.

The film was released theatrically in South Korea on April 21, 2022. It was screened in Masters & Auteurs section of the 46th Hong Kong International Film Festival on August 16, 2022. It also made it to Icon section of 27th Busan International Film Festival and screened on October 6, 2022. 

The film was selected in main slate of 2022 New York Film Festival held from September 30 to October 16, 2022.

The film will be released in the United States by The Cinema Guild.

Reception

Box office
The film was released on 66 screens on April 21, 2022.

 it is at 49th place among all the Korean films released in the year 2022, with gross of US$71,560 and 10,492 admissions.

Critical response
 

David Rooney of Hollywood Reporter wrote, that the film "conceals thoughts on the insularity of creative communities, the ticking clock of an artist's life and the importance of remaining open to finding truth even in what appear to be random connections". Concluding the review Rooney stated, "The Novelist's Film is an unapologetically slight entry, stripped back to the point where it seems to be about nothing and has nothing especially profound to say. But it's a pleasurable exercise for an artist continually in conversation with himself about the value of his work and what his collaborators bring to it. As such, Hong's 27th feature is arguably less an essential new chapter than a teasing footnote to everything he's done before."
Guy Lodge reviewing for Variety opined, "The latest miniature from the prolific South Korean auteur won't rank among his most essential works, but it still offers playful pleasures aplenty."
Stephanie Bunbury of Deadline wrote, "Here's another walking-and-talking film from festival favorite Hong Sang-soo, encapsulating a sliver of Korean life with his customary elusive delicacy." Concluding Bunbury stated, "the film rather than sharing a sense of completion, makes it clear that this is the flow of creative life. They [the novelist and the director] will keep working. It's what they do."

James Mottram of the South China Morning Post gave 3.5 stars out of 5 and wrote, "Hong's film is driven by gentle coincidence and good humour". Mottram opined that "those who don't have the patience for Hong's delicate brand of cinema may find The Novelist's Film frustrating, but this simply shot tale of human interaction has a beauty all of its own." Jake Cole of the Slant Magazine gave 3.5 stars out of 4 and wrote, "The Novelist's Film suggests that Hong has yet to exhaust his methods of deriving significance and beauty from the most quotidian of details, and perhaps that his strongest work is yet to come."

Dennis Schwartz graded the film as B+ and left it for the viewer "to judge if Hong Sang-soo comes up with enough here to succeed in making a film that's both enjoyable and meaningful but Schwartz found it "gentle, sincere and inspiring". Rory O'Connor of The Film Stage graded the film as B and found the dialogues "as spiky and self-reflexive as everwrote". He opined  that the film is "modest, but light-hearted". Concluding, he wrote, "Hong's latest—which was made during COVID's restrictions, with plenty masks on show, and which Hong shot, edited, and even composed the score for—is ultimately a little ode to expression itself".

Awards and nominations

References

External links
 
 
 The Novelist's Film at Finecut

2022 films
2022 drama films
Films directed by Hong Sang-soo
2020s Korean-language films
South Korean black-and-white films
South Korean drama films
Silver Bear Grand Jury Prize winners